Harry W. Rilling (born August 6, 1947) is an American politician who currently serves as  mayor of Norwalk, Connecticut. He had previously served as Norwalk's police chief for 17 years before retiring. He is a Democrat, and was elected in 2013. Rilling defeated incumbent mayor Richard A. Moccia.

Early life and education 
Rilling was born in Norwalk, Connecticut on August 6, 1947 to Harry S. and Mary L. Rilling. He spent his early childhood partially in New Canaan, but was primarily raised in Norwalk. His father was a greenhouse worker while his mother was a homemaker. He has an elder brother and sister. Rilling graduated from Norwalk High School in 1965. 

He has a Bachelor of Science in criminal justice, summa cum laude, from Iona College, and a Master in Public Administration from the University of New Haven. He is a graduate of the FBI Executive Development Course.

Career 
He enlisted in the United States Navy in 1967, and was honorably discharged in 1971 with the rank of E-5. He joined the Norwalk Police Department in 1971 and rose to the rank of Chief in 1995, a position he held until his retirement in 2012. He served on the Norwalk Zoning Commission from 2012 until his election as Mayor in 2013. From 1996 to 2004, Rilling was an Adjunct Professor of Criminal Justice at Norwalk Community College.

Rilling was an on-site assessor and team leader with the Commission on Accreditation for Law Enforcement Agencies (CALEA); he is a past Chairman of the Mid-Fairfield Substance Abuse Coalition (MFSAC); past President of both the Fairfield County Chiefs of Police Association (FCCP) and the Connecticut Police Chiefs Association (CPCA); he is a Life member of the International Association of Chiefs of Police (IACP); and he is a board member of the National Committee on Narcotics and Dangerous Drugs (a committee of the Drug Enforcement Administration). Rilling served as Norwalk's Police Union President in 1976.

Personal life 
Rilling was married three times. He first married Cheryl A. Cocco on January 4, 1969 with whom he had three children, and divorced in 1993. On October 30, 2001 he married Wanda J. Crespo. Rilling married his third wife Lucia C. Medower (b. 1963) in November 2013. He has three children his first marriage.

His daughter, Christine Limone (née Rilling), a former day care operator, has been charged in the death of a toddler in her care in 2020. She has recently been offered a plea deal by state prosecutors. His son, Stephen Rilling, a former Fairfield Police detective has been arrested and charged in a narcotics arrest.

References

American municipal police chiefs
American people of German descent
Connecticut Democrats
Iona University alumni
Living people
Mayors of Norwalk, Connecticut
University of New Haven alumni
Year of birth missing (living people)
Norwalk High School (Connecticut) alumni